Cammi (Camille Benally) is a character appearing in American comic books published by Marvel Comics. She was created by Keith Giffen and Mitch Breitweiswr.

Publication history
Cammi first appeared in Drax the Destroyer #1 (November 2005), and was created by Keith Giffen and Mitch Breitweiser.

Cammi appeared in the Avengers Arena series as part of the Marvel NOW! event, and as one of the main characters in Avengers Undercover beginning in 2014.

Fictional character biography
Cammille "Cammi" Benally was an average, 10-year-old human girl with an absentee father and alcoholic, abusive mother in the small town of Coot's Bluff, Alaska. She encounters Drax the Destroyer when a prison ship containing Drax crash-lands on Earth just outside her town. Cammi befriends Drax and helps him protect Coot's Bluff from Paibok, Lunatik, and the Blood Brothers. A second prison ship later arrives and arrests both Drax and Cammi.

After arriving on Xandar, Cammi joins Drax, Nova and the other Guardians of the Galaxy to take on Annihilus and his Wave. Surviving Annihilus' attack on the intergalactic prison known as the Kyln, Drax and Cammi team up with the last member of the Xandarian Nova Corps, Richard Rider. Together they fight against the advancing Annihilation Wave as Drax trains Nova to be a warrior. During a doomed battle between the Annihilation Wave and the United Front, Drax stays behind to fight off the invaders while Cammi and others finish the evacuation. Drax leaves Cammi behind with the United Front as he goes to rescue Moondragon. After single-handedly killing Thanos, Drax returns with Moondragon, but with no report of Cammi's whereabouts. Cammi is later seen, alive, allied with one of Thanos' powerful, miniature assistants.

Avengers Arena
Cammi is one of sixteen teenagers kidnapped by Arcade, who forces them to fight each other to the death in his latest version of Murderworld. As the games in Murderworld begin, Cammi fights Rebecca Ryker and gives her the nickname Death Locket. As the young heroes sleep for the night, they are stalked by an unidentified cybernetic creature. Juston is attacked and the Sentinel he is working on folds around him, crushing him. After a brief fight, Cammi teams up with Darkhawk to find the stalker. Cammi is ambushed by X-23, who has been hunting the mysterious stalker as well. Disappointed in herself, Cammi pushes herself into an intense training session. Nico saves Cammi from an avalanche by using a "snow globe" spell and Chase busts her free. As gratitude, she offers to teach them survival skills in exchange for some firepower. Cammi also notes the death toll is at four, with two officially dead and two missing.

After being injured by Apex, Nico sacrifices herself by staying behind to get the other survivors to safety. The remaining teenage heroes catch up to Reptil and Hazmat and are invited to have shark steaks with them. Cullen Bloodstone confronts Reptil about their ignorance to the ongoing war, which Cammi agrees with before leaving to find Nico or avenge her. Everyone agrees to go back out into Murderworld. After Nara's death, Nico finally snaps and tries to kill everyone. When Chase refuses to let Cammi stop Nico, she broke his arm and leg, taking the Darkhawk amulet for herself to stop Nico from killing everyone. Cammi gives Chase the amulet again when Apex unleashes bugs, a sentient typhoon, and weaponized sand to attack the remaining teens on Murderworld. Soon after, Deathlocket stops the fight by killing Apex, and everyone is able to escape Murderworld and disperse.

Avengers Undercover
Once news broke about Arcade's kidnappings, Cammi and the other Murderworld survivors become infamous. Cammi finds out her mother is alive and tries to be a good daughter by going to her mother's AA meetings. She later tells her mom she has to go, despite her mom's protests. However, when Anachronism reveals Bloodstone's gone missing, all the survivors team up to head to Bagalia to find him. Once they do, Bloodstone reveals that he enjoys his life among the villains, and everyone, except Cammi, starts to enjoy it as well. When Cammi tries to tell the others to leave, Bloodstone instead has Daimon Hellstrom teleport the group to Arcade's latest party so they can kill him. Hazmat kills Arcade, so the teens fear they will be wanted for murder. Baron Zemo gives them a choice, they can join him or return to S.H.I.E.L.D. for punishment. Nico thinks of an alternative: pretend to join Zemo, then destroy his organization from the inside and prove themselves heroes to the outside world. Cammi doesn't want to take part and escapes, but is captured by Constrictor and jailed. After several months, she digs a small hole in her prison and overhears Zemo's plan and also realizes her cellmate is none other than Arcade, whose body double was actually killed by Hazmat. When Zemo tricks the Avengers into attacking Bagalia after feeding misinformation to Hazmat, he traps the Avengers and steals S.H.I.E.L.D.'s Helicarrier. Cammi is able to break free from her cell and interrupts Zemo's diatribe and proves the young Avengers did not kill Arcade and it was all a set-up. She then decides to return to outer space.

Drax
Cammi teams with the hero called Planet Terry to take a mercenary contract on Drax. They put aside their differences to make sure a small group of innocent children get back to their homeworlds safely. Cammi continues to fight with Drax as various situations arise. After these threats and dangers are resolved, Drax gives his current ship to Cammi, Terry and various others he had befriended along the way and urges them to stay together as a new heroic team.

Powers and abilities
Cammi is highly skilled in hand-to-hand combat, gymnastics, survival instincts, and piloting. She wears a spacesuit, and uses a jetpack, plasma pistol, and anti-personnel mines.

In other media
 Cammi appears in the video game Marvel: Avengers Alliance.

References

Characters created by Keith Giffen
Comics characters introduced in 2005
Marvel Comics female superheroes
Marvel Comics superheroes